Frans Van Giel (born Franciscus Alexius van Giel; 16 July 1892 – 7 April 1975) was a Belgian painter who was born in Oostmalle and died in Wechelderzande.

Notable achievements and associations

He is called the painter of the Campine and was a friend of the painter Jakob Smits. From 1930 until his death in 1975, he lived in Wechelderzande, and is also buried there.

Sources
 Frans Van Giel

1892 births
1975 deaths
20th-century Belgian painters
People from Malle
Royal Academy of Fine Arts (Antwerp) alumni